Coromoto may refer to:
 Heladería Coromoto, an ice cream shop in Venezuela
 Our Lady of Coromoto, the patroness of Venezuela